Pseudognaphalium saxicola, common name cliff cudweed or rabbit-tobacco, is a rare plant species endemic to the state of Wisconsin in the United States. It grows on ledges and in cracks in shaded limestone cliff-faces, usually those facing south or east. The species is listed as Threatened in Wisconsin and is assessed as T2 (Imperiled) by NatureServe.

Pseudognaphalium saxicola is an annual, covered with a thick coat of dense, woolly hairs. It produces a cluster of 2–4 small flower heads at the tips of the branches.

References

saxicola
Flora of Wisconsin